Xinzhuang Joint Office Tower, Executive Yuan is a joint Republic of China government buildings in Xinzhuang District, New Taipei, Taiwan.

History

The construction of the buildings were completed on 13 June 2013. All of the relevant government agencies then moved to the building in September 2013.

Architecture

The buildings were designed by M. H. Wu & Associates with a construction budget of NT$6,989,100,000. It consists of two towers, which are North Tower and South Tower. The building houses the headquarters of some ministries or councils of the central government, including Council of Indigenous Peoples, Hakka Affairs Council and the Ministry of Culture.

Transportation
The buildings are accessible within walking distance south of Xinzhuang Fuduxin Station of Taipei Metro.

See also
 Executive Yuan

References

External links

  

2013 establishments in Taiwan
Buildings and structures in New Taipei
Government buildings completed in 2013
Government buildings in Taiwan